The Ministry of Foreign Affairs of the Republic of Maldives is responsible for managing the Foreign relations of the Maldives.

History 
The Foreign Ministry was established on 22 December 1932 under the Arabic name Vuzarat Al-Kharijiyya to handle the Sultanate of the Maldives' foreign relations.

List of Foreign Ministers

References

External links 
 Ministry of Foreign Affairs

Politics of the Maldives
Political organisations based in the Maldives
Maldives
1932 establishments in the British Empire